Isaac van Duynen (1628 – ca. 1680) was a Dutch Golden Age still life painter.

He was a native of Dordrecht, who according to Houbraken was one of the best still life painters of fish. According to J.C. Weyerman he became a member of the Confrerie Pictura in 1665 and was the son of guild member Gerrit van Duynen. He was possibly a pupil of Jacob Gerritsz. Cuyp and was also known as Deynen or Duijnen. He travelled to Rome during the years 1651-1657 and is known for fish & fruit still lifes. In 1657 on his return to the Netherlands he settled in The Hague and became a member of the Confrerie in 1665. He was a follower of Pieter van Noort and Jan Davidsz de Heem. His works are sometimes confused with those of Abraham van Beyeren, Alexander Adrianssen, Jan Dirven, Pieter van den Bemden, Benjamin Gerritsz Cuyp, and Jan Abel Wassenbergh. He died between December 1679 and February 1681.

According to Michael Bryan, he went in 1664 to the Hague, where he became a pupil of Abraham van Beijeren, and painted sea and river fish very successfully. Bryan wrote that he died at the Hague in 1688 or 1689. His painting Cod-fish resides in the Palais des Beaux-Arts de Lille.

Notes

References

Isaac van Duynen on Hoogsteder & Hoogsteder website with archival evidence of quarrelsome behavior

Attribution:
 

1628 births
1680s deaths
Dutch Golden Age painters
Dutch male painters
Dutch still life painters
Artists from Dordrecht
Painters from The Hague
Date of birth unknown
Year of death uncertain